Arrie Schoeman (born 3 October 1966) is a South African former cricketer. He played in twelve first-class and eight List A matches for Border from 1988/89 to 1995/96.

See also
 List of Border representative cricketers

References

External links
 

1966 births
Living people
South African cricketers
Border cricketers
Sportspeople from Qonce